The 2011 UTSA Roadrunners football team represented the University of Texas at San Antonio in the 2011 NCAA Division I FCS football season. It was the first year of play for UTSA. The team was coached by veteran head football coach Larry Coker. The team played its home games at the Alamodome and competed as an independent in the NCAA Division I Football Championship Subdivision. It was UTSA's only season as a Division I FCS team, as the Roadrunners moved to the Western Athletic Conference for the 2012 NCAA Division I FBS football season. Because UTSA was transitioning to the FBS, the NCAA declared the team ineligible for the FCS playoffs.

UTSA played its first game against Northeastern State on September 3, 2011, at the Alamodome, a 31–3 victory for UTSA.  With an attendance of 56,743, UTSA set a record for the highest-attended game for an NCAA Division I FCS start-up program.

UTSA finished their first season with a record of 4–6, and set a record for the largest average home attendance for a new football program with 35,521. This topped the previous record from South Florida of 33,038 in 1997.

Recruiting

Schedule

The night before the program's first game, it was reported that the Longhorn Network (LHN), the Texas Longhorns-based network, would air the final five Roadrunner home games. At the time of the initial news reports, the five scheduled UTSA games were more than the two Texas football games (against Rice and Kansas) scheduled for the network. The kickoff times for the scheduled games were moved to fit with the LHN schedule.

Depth chart

Roster

References

UTSA
UTSA Roadrunners football seasons
UTSA Roadrunners football